George Kelly may refer to:

Entertainment
 George Kelly (musician) (1915–1998), American jazz tenor saxophonist, vocalist, arranger and bandleader
 George Kelly (playwright) (1887–1974), American dramatist
 George "Fowokan" Kelly (born 1943), Jamaica-born British visual artist
 George M. Kelly (born 1952), New York sculptor who created a George Washington bronze for the Millennium Gate museum in Atlanta

Sports
 George A. Kelly (1883–1969), American football coach in the United States
 George Kelly (baseball) (1895–1984), American first baseman; played 1915–1932
 George Kelly (boxer), Irish boxer who competed at the 1928 Summer Olympics in Amsterdam
 George Kelly (footballer) (1933–1998), footballer who played for Cardiff City, Stockport County and Stoke City

Other
 George Kelly (Jacobite) (c.1680–1762), Irish agent of Charles Edward Stuart
 George Kelly (psychologist) (1905–1967), American personality theorist and professor at Ohio State University
 George Bradshaw Kelly (1900–1971), Democratic member of the United States House of Representatives from New York
 George E. M. Kelly (1878–1911), American Army 2nd lieutenant; namesake of San Antonio's Kelly Field Annex
 George Kelly Barnes (1895–1954), American gangster, bootlegger and kidnapper
 George Kelly (billiards player), American champion pool competitor of the 1920s and 30s; nephew of George Kelly
 Mike Kelly (Pennsylvania politician) (George Joseph Kelly Jr., born 1948), member of the U.S. House of Representatives

See also
George Kelley (disambiguation)
George Kelly Scott (born 1966), Liberia-born Swedish boxer